"Rush You" is a song by Australian rock band Baby Animals. It was released in August 1991 as their second single from their debut studio album Baby Animals (1991). The song peaked at number 30 on the ARIA Singles Chart.

Track listings
Vinyl/CD single (25003)
 "Rush You" – 4:10
 "Big Time Friends" – 4:54

Charts

External links

References

1991 songs
1991 singles
Baby Animals songs
Songs written by Suze DeMarchi
Song recordings produced by Mike Chapman